Arthur Mayo VC (18 May 1840 – 18 May 1920) was an English recipient of the Victoria Cross, the highest and most prestigious award for gallantry in the face of the enemy that can be awarded to British and Commonwealth forces.

Details
Arthur Mayo was educated at Berkhamsted School and, following his naval career, at Magdalen Hall, now Hertford College, Oxford.

He was 17 years old, and a midshipman in the Indian Naval Brigade during the Indian Mutiny when the following deed took place on 22 November 1857 at Dacca, India for which he was awarded the VC:

He died in Bournemouth on his 80th birthday.

References

External links
Burial location of Arthur Mayo "Dorset"
News item "Arthur Mayo's Victoria Cross resides in the Museum of Bombay"

1840 births
1920 deaths
People from Oxford
Royal Navy officers
British recipients of the Victoria Cross
Indian Rebellion of 1857 recipients of the Victoria Cross
Alumni of Magdalen Hall, Oxford
People educated at Berkhamsted School
British East India Company Marine personnel
Royal Indian Navy officers
Military personnel from Oxfordshire
Burials in Hampshire